The governor of California is the head of government of California, whose responsibilities include making annual State of the State addresses to the California State Legislature, submitting the budget, and ensuring that state laws are enforced. The governor is also the commander-in-chief of the state's military forces. The current governor is Gavin Newsom, who has been in office since 2019.

Thirty-nine people have served as governor, over 40 distinct terms; many have been influential nationwide in areas far-flung from politics. Leland Stanford founded Stanford University in 1891. Earl Warren, later Chief Justice of the United States, won an election with the nominations of the three major parties – the only person ever to run essentially unopposed for governor of California. Ronald Reagan, who was president of the Screen Actors Guild and later President of the United States, and Arnold Schwarzenegger both came to prominence through acting. Gray Davis, the 37th governor of California, was the second governor in American history to be recalled by voters. The shortest tenure was that of Milton Latham, who served only five days before being elected by the legislature to fill a vacant United States Senate seat. The longest tenure is that of Jerry Brown, who previously served as governor from 1975 to 1983 and again from 2011 to 2019, the only governor to serve non-consecutive terms. He is the son of former governor Pat Brown who served from 1959 to 1967.

List of governors

California was obtained by the United States in the Mexican Cession following the Mexican–American War. Unlike most other states, it was never organized as a territory, and was admitted as the 31st state on September 9, 1850.

The original California Constitution of 1849 called for elections every two years, with no set start date for the term. An amendment ratified in 1862 increased the term to four years, and the 1879 constitution set the term to begin on the first Monday after January 1 following an election. In 1990, Proposition 140 led to a constitutional amendment implementing a term limit of two terms; prior to this limit, only one governor, Earl Warren, served more than two terms. Jerry Brown was able to be elected to a third term in 2010 because his previous terms were before the term limit was enacted. The 1849 constitution also created the office of lieutenant governor, who, in cases of vacancy in the office of governor, becomes governor. The governor and lieutenant governor are not elected on the same ticket.

See also

 Gubernatorial lines of succession in the United States#California
 List of California state legislatures
 List of governors of California before 1850
 Spouses of the governor of California

Notes

References

General

Constitutions

Specific

External links

Office of the Governor of California

 
Lists of state governors of the United States
Governors